Kaleshwar may refer to:

Shri Kaleshwar Mandir, a Hindu temple in Nerur, Sindhudurg District, Maharashtra
Mahakaleshwar Jyotirlinga, a Hindu temple in Ujjain, Ujjain District, Madhya Pradesh